Morris Army Airfield  was a military airport located at Fort Gillem, within the city of Forest Park in Clayton County, Georgia, southwest of the city of Atlanta, Georgia, just  east of the Hartsfield–Jackson Atlanta International Airport.

See also
 Fort Gillem
 Fort McPherson

References

External links
Forrest Park/Fort Gillem redevelopment program and its master plan (schema) (forestparkga.org)
Fort McPherson/Fort Gillem (GlobalSecurity.org)
Information about Fort Gillem (FAA)
Information about Fort Gillem (AirNav)
Information about Fort Gillem (SkyVector)

United States Army airfields
Defunct airports in Georgia (U.S. state)
Airports in Georgia (U.S. state)
Buildings and structures in Chattahoochee County, Georgia
Airfields of the United States Army Air Forces in Georgia (U.S. state)